Slugbucket Hairybreath Monster is an EP by the New Zealand band Tall Dwarfs, released in 1984.

Track listing

Side A
"The Brain That Wouldn't Die"
"Phil's Disease (Day One)"
"I've Left Memories Behind"

Side B
"Phil's Disease (Day Four)"
"Crush"

References

Tall Dwarfs albums
1984 EPs
Flying Nun Records EPs